Kalbe Sadiq (22 June 1939 - 24 November 2020) was an Indian Islamic scholar.

He was born in 1939 in Lucknow and died on 24 November 2020 after a prolonged terminal sickness. He was posthumously bestowed with the accredited national award of Padma Bhushan in 2021. 

His father, Kalbe Hussain, was also an Islamic scholar and his late brother, Kalbe Abid, was also an Islamic scholar head of Shia Theology Department at Aligarh Muslim University.

Education and professional Life 

Kalbe Sadiq received his early education from the Madrasa of Sultan ul Madaris and Nazmia in Lucknow. He then moved to Aligarh Muslim University, Aligarh and obtained the degree of Ph.D. in Arabic Literature with a gold medal in 1971.

Beside Arabic, Kalbe Sadiq had mastery over Urdu, Persian, English and Hindi languages. He traveled overseas to deliver speeches and lectures on Islamic theology.

Kalbe Sadiq engaged on religious and social issues with the Muslim masses in mid 1970s. He was moved by the pathetic condition of the community. He believed that the root cause of the backwardness of Muslims lies in its distance from education and knowledge. He therefore resolved to spread education and knowledge on modern lines and waged a community wide war against illiteracy and ignorance. This became the aim of his life.

Philanthropic works
He founded the Tauheedul Muslimeen Trust on 18 April 1984 with an aim to give educational assistance and scholarships to needy and poor students.
The educational, charitable and constructive projects that were running under his supervision include:
 Tauheedul Muslimeen Trust, Lucknow
 Unity College, Lucknow
 Unity Mission School, Lucknow
 Unity Industrial Training Center, Lucknow
 Unity Public School, Allahabad
 M.U. College, Aligarh
 Unity Computer Centre, Lucknow
 Unity Free Education Programmes in Lucknow, Jaunpur, Jalalpur, Allahabad, Barabanki, Moradabad and Aligarh etc.
 Hiza Charitable Hospital, Lucknow
 T.M.T Medical Centre, Shikarpur, U.P.
 T.M.T’s Widows' Pension Scheme
 T.M.T’s Orphans' Educational Sponsorship Scheme
 Reconstruction and expansion of the Imam Bargah of Ghufran Maab, Lucknow
 Reconstruction and renovation of the tomb of Urdu elegy writer and Marsia Khwan Hazrat Meer Anees, Lucknow
He was also the President of The Era’s Medical College & Hospital Lucknow and the general secretary of All India Shia Conference besides being a member of Anjuman-e-Wazifiya-e-Sadat-o-Momineen.

References

External links
 What makes Maulana Dr. Syed Kalbe Sadiq a reformer?
 Struggling Against Sectarianism: Shia-Sunni Ecumenism
 "Give Babri land away and win hearts" - AIMPLB Vice President Maulana Kalbe Sadiq 
 K.C. Sudarshan and eminent Shia cleric Maulana Kalbe Sadiq asked people not to vote by religion but elect candidates who are honest and have a good character
 Prophet had prohibited cow meat, says Kalbe Sadiq
 "An interview with Maulana Kalbe Sadiq, a leading Indian Shia scholar"
 Taliban is Anti-Islamic, Says Leading Islamic Cleric
 An Islamic Critique of Patriarchy: Maulana Kalbe Sadiq’s Approach to Gender Relations in Islam
 Not four, but one marriage for Muslims
 Islam permits birth control: Shia cleric Maulana Sadiq
 When we are no longer called Muslim Indians but Indian Muslims

1939 births
2020 deaths
Indian Islamic religious leaders
20th-century Muslim scholars of Islam
Scholars from Lucknow
Indian Shia Muslims
Shia scholars of Islam
Aligarh Muslim University alumni
Indian people of Arab descent
Ijtihadi family